This article documents statistics from the 1999 Rugby World Cup, principally hosted in Wales from 1 October to 6 November.

Team statistics
The following table shows the team's results in major statistical categories.

Source: ESPNscrum.com

Top point scorers

Top try scorers

Hat-tricks
Unless otherwise noted, players in this list scored a hat-trick of tries.

Stadiums

See also
 2003 Rugby World Cup statistics
 Records and statistics of the Rugby World Cup
 List of Rugby World Cup hat-tricks

External links
Rugby World Cup 1999 Tournament statistics
Rugby World Cup 1999 Team Stats

References

Statistics
Rugby union records and statistics